Gormasi (also Romanized as Gormāsī) is a village in Jannatabad Rural District, Salehabad County, Razavi Khorasan Province, Iran. At the 2006 census, its population was 117, in 24 families.

References 

Populated places in   Torbat-e Jam County